Plan Nine Publishing was a small press book publisher known for publishing webcomics in printed form. The first series published, and perhaps its most famous, was Kevin and Kell.

History
Plan Nine Publishing was named after the Ed Wood film Plan 9 from Outer Space. The publisher was owned by David Allen, who worked publishing alongside his day job as a systems engineer at Financial Computing in Winston-Salem. Plan nine was started in 1996, and in January 2000 Allen left his day job to concentrate full-time on the publishing business.

98% of Plan Nine's products were sold direct to customers through their website. With low print runs (typically less than 2000), the company were able to run with a profit with runs as low as 300. The low running costs meant that the company was able to have a 70% gross profit margin, and was able to give its artists a 20% royalty, more than 4 times the industrial average.

In April 2008, the Plan Nine main page was replaced by a message stating: Plan Nine has gone on hiatus for re-tooling and transition to new owners.  Please check back with us Sept 1st, 2008. Thanks for your support!  That page remained until the site finally went offline in 2010.

Publications
In addition to Kevin and Kell, Plan Nine published a number of other notable webcomics, including:
 Bastard Operator From Hell
 Buckles
 Doctor Fun
 Monty
On the Fastrack
 Ozy and Millie
Safe Havens
 Sluggy Freelance
 The Suburban Jungle
 User Friendly

Plan Nine also published Black Box Voting by Bev Harris, a nonfiction book discussing the issues involved in computer-based balloting. In 2004, the company published I Lived With My Parents and Other Tales of Terror, a collection of nonfiction and humor essays by Mary Jo Pehl.

References 

Magazine publishing companies of the United States
Webcomic publishing companies